Karlovac is a village in the municipality of Glamoč in Canton 10, the Federation of Bosnia and Herzegovina, Bosnia and Herzegovina.

Demographics 

According to the 2013 census, the village was uninhabited.

Footnotes

Bibliography 

 

Populated places in Glamoč